Ryszard Dawidowicz (born 11 June 1960) is a Polish former cyclist. He competed in two events at the 1988 Summer Olympics.

References

External links
 

1960 births
Living people
Polish male cyclists
Olympic cyclists of Poland
Cyclists at the 1988 Summer Olympics
People from Gryfino County
Sportspeople from West Pomeranian Voivodeship